Christian Richards Jacobs (born January 11, 1972) is an American musician, television producer, and actor. He is perhaps most recognized as the co-creator of the award-winning Nick Jr. series Yo Gabba Gabba!, on which he additionally serves as a writer, director, composer, and voice actor.

Under the stage persona of The MC Bat Commander, Jacobs is also well known for his work as lead singer for the Orange County rock band The Aquabats, which he co-founded in 1994. In addition to his musical work with the band, Jacobs also portrayed the character of the Bat Commander on the live-action comedy television series The Aquabats! Super Show!, which he also co-created and produced, from 2012 to 2014.

Biography

Early life
Jacobs was born in Rexburg, Idaho in 1972, the second of five children. Following his family's relocation to Los Angeles at the age of 4, Jacobs and his siblings, namely his older sister Rachel and younger brothers Parker and Tyler, began working as child actors. Throughout the course of his childhood and into his late teens, Jacobs appeared in numerous productions, most prominently playing the role of Joey Stivic in the short-lived All in the Family spin-off Gloria, but primarily playing small roles in teen films such as Pretty in Pink and Gleaming the Cube and episodes of sitcoms like Married... with Children and Roseanne, before retiring from acting in the early 1990s, citing a dislike of the competitive nature of the business.

While working on Gleaming the Cube, Jacobs befriended a number of well known and highly influential skateboarders and artists. In 1990, he worked alongside Mark Gonzales and Jason Lee on Blind Skateboards Video Days, and as an artist, Jacobs designed board graphics for Tony Hawks Birdhouse Skateboards and for the Jason Lee and Steve Berra pro models.

The great-grandson of prominent Mormon leader LeGrand Richards, Jacobs is a lifelong member of the Church of Jesus Christ of Latter-day Saints. In 1991, he left the United States to serve as a missionary in the Sendai, Japan mission and lived in and around Tōhoku, Japan for two years. Upon returning to California, he began working different jobs and moonlighting in bands.

The Aquabats

In 1994, Jacobs, along with friends Chad Larson and Boyd Terry, formed the Orange County-based band The Aquabats, wherein he acted as lead singer and lyricist under the stage name of The MC Bat Commander (formerly "The Caped Commander" and "The Bat Commander"). Noted for their matching costumes and theatrical stage shows centered around their superhero-themed alter-ego, The Aquabats initially formed as part of the burgeoning Orange County ska scene, though since 2000 have evolved into playing more punk and new wave-influenced rock music.

Though The Aquabats are most recognized for being a cult act, the band experienced brief mainstream commercial success in the late 1990s during the height of the American ska revival, when their second album The Fury of The Aquabats! peaked at number 172 on the Billboard 200, granting the band national exposure on MTV and as part of the 1998 Vans Warped Tour. During this time, Jacobs was also active producing skateboarding videos with his friend and creative partner Scott Schultz. In 1999, Jacobs anonymously performed with other members of The Aquabats in the side project The Sandfleas, playing drums under the stage name "Fang".

As of 2022, The Aquabats continue to tour and record, and the band's sixth studio album, Kooky Spooky...In Stereo was released in August 2020. On March 3, 2012, The Aquabats! Super Show!, a live-action musical television series starring the band, premiered on cable channel The Hub, with Jacobs serving as co-creator, producer, writer and star. Despite accumulating six Daytime Emmy nominations over the course of two seasons, winning one for stunt coordination, The Hub declined to pick Super Show! up for a third season, effectively cancelling the series. Following a successful Kickstarter campaign in 2018, Super Show! was retooled as a bi-weekly YouTube series which began airing in late 2019.

Yo Gabba Gabba!
In 1999, Jacobs and Schultz formed a production company which was later formalized as "The Magic Store" with the goal of creating family-oriented television entertainment. Together, the two independently created, wrote and directed two pilot episodes in 2005 for a preschooler-targeted children's television series called Yo Gabba Gabba!. The series was picked up by ViacomCBSs Nickelodeon channel in 2007, eventually becoming an international success and winning numerous television awards. Yo Gabba Gabba! has since completed four seasons. The pilot started in 1999.

Personal life
Christian Jacobs is an avid surfer, skateboarder, Japanese toy collector and artist. He lives in Huntington Beach, California, with his wife and four children.

Discography

The Aquabats
The Return of The Aquabats (1996) - vocals
The Fury of The Aquabats! (1997) - vocals
The Aquabats vs. the Floating Eye of Death! (1999) - vocals
Myths, Legends and Other Amazing Adventures, Vol. 2 (2000) - vocals
Yo! Check Out This Ride! EP (2004) - vocals
Charge!! (2005) - vocals
Radio Down! (2010) - vocals
Hi-Five Soup! (2011) - vocals
The Aquabats! Super Show! Television Soundtrack: Volume One (2019) - vocals
Kooky Spooky...In Stereo (2020) - vocals

Collaborations
"Got Sumethin' (That You Ought to Know)" from Bad Credit's album Giving Back by Giving Up (2004)
"This Gigantic Robot Kills" from MC Lars album This Gigantic Robot Kills (2009)

Filmography

Film

Television

Music Videos

Awards
The following list is of awards Christian Jacobs has been personally nominated for:

|-
| 1983
| Young Artist Award
| Best Young Actor in a New Television Series (Gloria)
| 
|-
| 1986
| Young Artist Award
| Outstanding Young Actor - Animation Voice Over (Disney's Adventures of the Gummi Bears)
| 
|-
| 2008
| Daytime Emmy
| Outstanding Achievement in Costume Design/Styling (Yo Gabba Gabba!)
| 
|-
| 2009
| Daytime Emmy
| Outstanding Achievement in Costume Design/Styling (Yo Gabba Gabba!)
| 
|-
| rowspan="2"|2011
| Daytime Emmy
| Outstanding Achievement in Art Direction/Set Decoration/Scenic Design (Yo Gabba Gabba!)
| 
|-
| Daytime Emmy
| Outstanding Pre-School Children's Series (Yo Gabba Gabba!)
| 
|-
| rowspan="2"|2012
| Daytime Emmy
| Outstanding Achievement in Costume Design/Styling (Yo Gabba Gabba!)
| 
|-
| Daytime Emmy
| Outstanding Pre-School Children's Series (Yo Gabba Gabba!)
| 
|-
| 2013
| Daytime Emmy
| Outstanding Children's Series (The Aquabats! Super Show!)
| 
|-
| 2014
| Daytime Emmy
| Outstanding Writing for a Children's Series (The Aquabats! Super Show!)
| 
|}

References

External links
 
 

1972 births
20th-century Mormon missionaries
American male child actors
American child models
American Latter Day Saint writers
American male singers
American Mormon missionaries in Japan
American punk rock singers
American male television actors
Television producers from California
American television writers
American male television writers
The Aquabats members
Living people
Singers from California
Singers from Idaho
People from Huntington Beach, California
People from Rexburg, Idaho
Latter Day Saints from California
Screenwriters from California
Screenwriters from Idaho
21st-century American singers